Statistics of Bahraini Premier League in the 1958–59 season.

Overview
Al-Nasr won the championship.

References
RSSSF

Bahraini Premier League seasons
Bahrain
football